Iwilei station is a planned Honolulu Rail Transit station in Honolulu, Hawaii. It is part of the fourth HART segment, scheduled to open in 2031.

The Hawaiian Station Name Working Group proposed Hawaiian names for the twelve rail stations on the eastern end of the rail system (stations in the Airport and City Center segments) in April 2019. The proposed name for this station, Kūwili, means "water swirling in place" and refers to a parcel of land in the Honolulu ahupuaʻa that contained a large fishpond watered by Leleo Stream.

References

External links
 

Honolulu Rail Transit stations
Railway stations scheduled to open in 2031